This article is one of a series providing information about endemism among birds in the world's various zoogeographic zones. For an overview of this subject see Endemism in birds.

List of species

Western Himalayan endemics
 Black-crested tit (Periparus ater melanolophus)
 Black-headed jay (Garrulus lanceolatus)
 Brooks's leaf-warbler (Phylloscopus subviridis)
 Cheer pheasant (Catreus wallichi)
 Himalayan black-lored tit (Machlolophus xanthogenys)
 Himalayan bluetail (Tarsiger rufilatus)
 Himalayan monal (Lophophorus impejanus)
 Himalayan shrike-babbler (Pteruthius ripleyi)
 Himalayan snowcock (Tetraogallus himalayensis)
 Himalayan vulture (Gyps himalayensis)
 Hodgson's treecreeper (Certhia hodgsoni)
 Kashmir flycatcher (Ficedula subrubra)
 Kashmir nuthatch (Sitta cashmirensis)
 Koklass pheasant (Pucrasia macrolopha)
 Kashmir nutcracker (Nucifraga multipunctata)
 Orange bullfinch (Pyrrhula aurantiaca)
 Slaty-headed parakeet (Psittacula himalayana)
 Snow partridge (Lerwa lerwa)
 Snow pigeon (Columba leuconota)
 Spectacled finch (Callacanthis burtoni)
 Tibetan blackbird (Turdus maximus)
 Western tragopan (Tragopan melanocephalus)
 White-cheeked tit (Aegithalos leucogenys)
 White-throated tit (Aegithalos niveogularis)
 White-cheeked nuthatch ( Sitta leucopsis)

Central Himalayan endemics
 Hoary-throated barwing (Actinodura nipalensis)
 Nepal cupwing (Pnoepyga immaculata)
 Spiny babbler (Turdoides nipalensis)
kahef

Eastern Himalayan endemics
 Beautiful sibia (Heterophasia pulchella)
 Blyth's tragopan (Tragopan blythii)
 Broad-billed warbler (Tickellia hodgsoni)
 Brown-capped laughingthrush (Garrulax austeni)
 Brown-throated fulvetta (Alcippe ludlowi)
 Chestnut-breasted partridge (Arborophila mandellii)
 Dark-rumped swift (Apus acuticauda)
 Grey sibia (Heterophasia gracilis)
 Hoary-throated barwing (Actinodura nipalensis)
 Rufous-throated wren-babbler (Spelaeornis caudatus)
 Rusty-bellied shortwing (Brachypteryx hyperythra)
 Mishmi wren-babbler (Spelaeornis badeigularis)
 Sclater's monal (Lophophorus sclateri)
 Snowy-throated babbler (Stachyris oglei)
 Streak-throated barwing (Actinodura waldeni)
 Striped laughingthrush (Garrulax virgatus)
 Tawny-breasted wren-babbler (Spelaeornis longicaudatus)
 Ward's trogon (Harpactes wardi)
 White-browed nuthatch (Sitta victoriae)
 White-naped yuhina (Yuhina bakeri)
 Yellow-vented warbler (Phylloscopus cantator))

Near-endemics
The following species are almost wholly confined to the Himalayas, with only a small part of their range occurring beyond.
 White-tailed nuthatch
 Yellow-browed tit

Himalayan